Plaza de Armas of Trujillo is the main square where the Spanish foundation of Trujillo was made, in northern Peru. It has been the principal locus of history in this city in the republic era. It is located in the central zone of the Historic Centre of Trujillo. In the streets that form this main square are located the buildings of Municipality Palace, the Cathedral, among others. The Plaza de Armas of Trujillo is formed by the Pizarro, Independencia, Orbegoso and Almagro streets. In this square, the proclamation of the independence of Trujillo took place.

History

Martin de Estete began the design of the streets of Trujillo by order of Diego de Almagro in the end of the year of 1534, so he designed the structure and dimensions of the Plaza de Armas. In 1841, Pedro de Mandalengoitia Sanz de Zarate donated to the square a fountain made of white stone that was built on his farm and mill in Santa Cruz de Carabamba. On December 29, 1820, the Plaza de Armas was the scene of the proclamation of Independence of Trujillo by the Marquis of Torre Tagle. In this square are located the cathedral of the city and mansions dating back to the Hispanic and republican periods. On July 4, 1929, in the middle of this square, the Freedom Monument was opened, which represents the country's independence process and according to "commentators it represents the most precious of human beings, the love of freedom, the memory and recognition of the distinguished men who gave us independence". The statue was a work in Germany,  the materials used are marble and copper, the sculptor was Edmund Moeller and it was armed by Henry Albrecht.

Freedom Monument
The Freedom Monument, located in the center of the Plaza de Armas of Trujillo (Peru) and work of sculptor Edmund Moeller, consists of three sections: the first is on a circular platform with pedestals, resting on a granite base, supporting the sculptures represent the art, science, trade and health. The second consists of three statues robust. A statue of a man who snorts, it is bent, symbolizing oppression or slavery. A second statue's arms back, symbolizing the struggle for freedom. The third statue is a man with arms raised and hands making fist, symbolizing liberation. Also in this body are located the next plates: the first recalling the proclamation of the independence of Trujillo, José Bernardo de Torre Tagle, the December 29, 1820. The second plaque commemorates the Battle of Junín, and the third plaque commemorates the Battle of Ayacucho.

Buildings

Streets

Francisco Pizarro
Diego de Almagro
Independencia
Mariscal Orbegoso

Celebrations and festivals 
In the Plaza de Armas of Trujillo are realized important celebrations y ceremonies such as Corpus Christi in June, parade for Trujillo Marinera Festival in January, independence day of Trujillo in December 29 of every year, etc.

See also 
 Trujillo
 Historic Centre of Trujillo
 Independence of Trujillo
 La Libertad Region

External links

References 

Squares in Trujillo, Peru